Cecilia Rich is a New Hampshire politician.

Education
Rich attended University of New Hampshire.

Career
On November 6, 2018, Rich was elected to the New Hampshire House of Representatives where she represents the Strafford 18 district. Rich assumed office on December 5, 2018. Rich is a Democrat. Rich endorses Bernie Sanders in the 2020 Democratic Party presidential primaries.

Personal life
Rich resides in Somersworth, New Hampshire. Rich is married and has two children.

References

Living people
Women state legislators in New Hampshire
University of New Hampshire alumni
People from Somersworth, New Hampshire
Democratic Party members of the New Hampshire House of Representatives
21st-century American women politicians
21st-century American politicians
Year of birth missing (living people)